Palasa Assembly constituency is a constituency in Srikakulam district of Andhra Pradesh. It is one of the seven assembly segments of Srikakulam (Lok Sabha constituency), along with Ichchapuram, Tekkali, Pathapatnam, Srikakulam, Amadalavalasa and Narasannapeta. , there are a total of 204,109 electors in the constituency. In 2019 state assembly election, Seediri Appalaraju was elected as an MLA of the constituency, representing the YSR Congress Party.

Overview

Constituency Details of Palasa (Assembly constituency).

Country: India.
 State: Andhra Pradesh.
 District: Srikakulam district.
 Region: Coastal Andhra.
 Seat: Unreserved.
 Eligible Electors as per 2019 General Elections: 2,04,109 Eligible Electors. Male Electors:1,00,875. Female Electors:1,03,185.

Mandals 

The three mandals that form the assembly constituency..

Members of Legislative Assembly Palasa 

Following is the list of members who got elected from Palasa (Assembly constituency) to Andhra Pradesh Legislature till date.

Election results

Assembly Elections 2009

Assembly elections 2014

Assembly elections 2019

See also 
 List of constituencies of the Andhra Pradesh Legislative Assembly

References 

Assembly constituencies of Andhra Pradesh